The American Sable is a rabbit breed recognized by the American Rabbit Breeders Association (ARBA). The American Sable rabbit breed can trace its roots to colored throwbacks from purebred Chinchilla rabbits belonging to Otto Brock of San Gabriel, California, in 1924.

Appearance
The American Sable is a result of Chinchilla rabbit crosses. Sables are identical to Chinchilla rabbits in body conformation, but their coats are colored differently. The head, feet, ears, back, and top of the tail are a dark sepia, while the coat fades to a lighter tan over the rest of the body, similar to the coloring of a Siamese cat. The breed's eyes are usually dark with a ruby hue.

Typically their weight can reach .

Demeanor
The American Sable enjoys the company of other rabbits. It is generally docile, spending most of the day sleeping. Typically they enjoy the companionship of their owner, but on their own terms. When distressed, the American Sable will make a grunting noise or will, like many other breeds, thump its back foot on the ground in an attempt to scare whatever it is that is bothering them.

See also

List of rabbit breeds

References

External links
American Rabbit Breeders Association
American Sable Rabbit Breed History
Different Breeds of Rabbits

Rabbit breeds
Rabbits as pets
Rabbit breeds originating in the United States
Animal breeds on the GEH Red List